I Gede Ari Astina better known Jerinx or JRX (born 10 February 1977) is an Indonesian musician and conspiracy theorist on COVID-19. He is the drummer of the Bali-based rock group Superman Is Dead. In 2020, he was sentenced to jail for defamation, after he accused Indonesia's chief medical association of being servile to the World Health Organization for mandating COVID-19 testing for pregnant women, which he claimed could kill them and their babies.

Personal life 
In 2019, he married Nora Alexandra (born 1994), a model of Swiss descent, who was previously married to the Malaysian actor Aliff Alli Khan.

Activism

Rejection against land reclamation of Benoa Bay 
Jerinx has been against land reclamation in Benoa Bay, Bali since 2014 because of its social impacts. On July 10 2018, Jerinx demanded that Indonesian President Joko Widodo fulfill his promise in 2015 to follow up on the Benoa Bay reclamation issue.

Controversy

Via Vallen's copyright infringement case 
On November 11, 2018, Jerinx criticized dangdut singer Via Vallen in an Instagram post for recycling the 2013 SID song "Sunset di Tanah Anarki" without permission. Vallen is said to have lost the meaning of the song. "VV [Via Vallen] should have learned to be human, don't just take it. During this time singing SDTA [Sunset di Tanah Anarchy] thousands of times, did our song lyrics have no meaning for her? After her success, what can you do to appreciate the works that bring you to a better place? With millions of followers, at least contribute to the Melawan Lupa movement, or 1965 historical rectification, Kendeng's struggle, etc., there are so many things that VV can do without having to spend money."Vallen apologized through his Instagram account, saying that he did not mean to spoil the song by singing it in the dangdut koplo arrangement. Jerinx later accepted the apology, but did not withdraw his previous comment.

Rejection of Music Bill 
In February 2019 Jerinx was involved in a controversy with Anji, another Indonesian musician, regarding the issue of the Music Bill. After Anji's vlog video on YouTube interviewing Anang Hermansyah regarding the Music Bill, Jerinx threatened Anji not to use their feud as a YouTube content to gain popularity and YouTube ad revenue.

Imprisonment for Defamation of the Indonesian Doctors Association 
In 2020, Jerinx began sharing unfounded conspiracy theories about coronavirus via social media and television interviews. He accused the "global elite", including Bill Gates, of being behind the pandemic. He spurned calls for social distancing and mask-wearing. In a post on his Instagram account, he accused the Indonesian Doctors Association (IDI) of being "lackeys" of the World Health Organization for requiring that mothers about to give birth be tested for coronavirus. He also claimed the test could kill people. In August 2020, Bali Police named him a suspect for alleged defamation of IDI. In October, he was arrested and charged with defamation, under articles of the Indonesia's Information and Electronic Transactions Law (UU ITE) and Criminal Code (KUHP).

Jerinx went on trial at Bali's Denpasar District Court. State prosecutor Otong Hendra Rahayu demanded he be sentenced to three years in prison. On 19 November 2020, the court sentenced Jerinx, to 14 months in prison for spreading hate speech against IDI via social media.

He was released early from Kerobokan Prison on 8 June 2021. He was picked up by his wife Nora, declined to comment and proceeded with a self-cleaning ceremony in Ubud.

External links

References

1977 births
Indonesian musicians
Living people
People from Badung Regency
Balinese people
Indonesian activists
Indonesian conspiracy theorists
Indonesian prisoners and detainees